2021–22 Abu Dhabi T10 was the fifth season of the Abu Dhabi T10. The matches had a 10-over-a-side format with a time duration of 90 minutes. The tournament was played from 19 November to 4 December 2021 at the Sheikh Zayed Cricket Stadium. A new team called The Chennai Braves were added in place of Maratha Arabians, Qalandars and Pune Devils.

Squads

Points table

 Advanced to Qualifier 1 Advanced to Eliminator

League stage

Playoffs

Qualifier 1

Eliminator

Qualifier 2

3rd place playoff

Final

References

External links
 Series home at ESPNCricinfo

2021 in Emirati cricket
Abu Dhabi T10 League